Diana Elizabeth Jane Burrell (born 25 October 1948) is an English composer and viola player.

Life and career

Burell was born on 25 October 1948 in Norwich, England. Her parents were Bernard Burrell, a schoolteacher by profession who served as an assistant organist at the cathedral, and Audrey Burrell (née Coleman). She attended Norwich High School for Girls before receiving her bachelor's of arts degree in music at Girton College, Cambridge. She began her career as a viola player, but soon became well known for her compositions and became a full-time composer. One of her first compositions was for the 1980 St Endellion Music Festival. She used to attend as a viola player, but festival organizer Richard Hickox told her she "ought to write something for the festival. The result, Missa Sancte Endeliente, was a large-scale mass using Cornish and Latin texts.

Her first major orchestral piece was titled Landscape (1988). It describes the wild, windswept countryside. It was one of the winners of the "Encore" awards organised by the Royal Philharmonic Society and BBC Radio 3. Another notable orchestral work was  Das Meer, das so groß und weit ist, da wimmelt's ohne Zahl, große und kleine Tiere ("The Sea is so big and wide and swarming with numerous little animals"). It describes the sounds and the atmosphere of the sea.

Burrell has written other orchestral works including concertos for viola, flute and clarinet, an opera The Albatross (1997), many choral works and chamber music. She likes modern architecture and her music sometimes shows this in the way it is shaped. She has also written music for young people, such as Lights and Shadows (1989) which includes a children's choir, a recorder group and much percussion.

She teaches at the Guildhall School of Music and Drama and became the Artistic Director of Spitalfields Festival in London in 2006, taking over from Jonathan Dove. In 2006, she was awarded a fellowship from the Arts and Humanities Research Council at the Royal Academy of Music, to compose a major series of ensemble organ works over five years. She lives in Harwich, Essex.

Selected works

Orchestra
Concerto
Gate (string orchestra)
Landscape (1988)
Das Meer, das so gross und weit ist, da wimmelt's ohne Zahl grosse und kleine Tiere
Symphonies of Flocks, Herds, and Shoals

Concertante
Clarinet Concerto (1996)
Flute Concerto (1997)
Viola Concerto “...calling, leaping, crying, dancing...” (1994)

Opera
The Albatross (1987; premiered at Trinity College of Music, 1997)

Choir
Alleluia (SATB choir)
Ave Verum Corpus (SATB choir)
Benedicam Dominum (SSATB and organ)
Come and See/Christ Child (piano and unison voice)
Creator/Stars of Night (SATB choir, English Horn, Organ Pedals)
Hymn to Wisdom (SATB choir)
Magnificat/Nunc (for treble voices and piano)
Michael's Mass (for unison voice and piano)
Missa Sancte Endeliente (1980)
Heil’ger Geist in’s Himmels Throne (1993, SATB choir, organ and percussion)

Other
Arched Forms with Bells (for organ)
Aria (for violin)
Barrow
Festival (for organ)
Gold (for piano and brass, also for piano solo)
Gulls and Angels (1983, string quartet)
Heron (for cello and piano)
King Shall Bright (for soprano, oboe, French horn, violin, and harp)
North Star (for trumpet and organ)
Songs for Harvey (for violin solo or viola solo) (1988)

References

External links
United Music Publishers official website for Diana Burrell
Page at the Royal Academy of Music
 https://www.presencecompositrices.com/compositrice/burrell-diana/

English composers
1948 births
Living people
Musicians from Norwich
English violists
Women violists
Alumni of Girton College, Cambridge
Academics of the Guildhall School of Music and Drama
People educated at Norwich High School for Girls
20th-century British composers
21st-century British composers
20th-century English women musicians
21st-century English women musicians
20th-century women composers
21st-century women composers
20th-century violists
21st-century violists